The 2001–02 Segunda Divisão season was the 68th season of the competition and the 52nd season of recognised third-tier football in Portugal.

Overview
The league was contested by 60 teams in 3 divisions with SC Covilhã, FC Marco and União Funchal winning the respective divisional competitions and gaining promotion to the Liga de Honra.  The overall championship was won by SC Covilhã.

League standings

Segunda Divisão – Zona Norte

Segunda Divisão – Zona Centro

Segunda Divisão – Zona Sul

Footnotes

External links
 Portuguese Division Two «B» – footballzz.co.uk

Portuguese Second Division seasons
Port
3